Segesterone acetate/ethinylestradiol (EE/SGA), sold under the brand name Annovera, is a contraceptive vaginal ring and combined form of hormonal birth control which contains segesterone acetate, a progestin and ethinylestradiol, an estrogen. It contains 17.4 mg ethinylestradiol and 103 mg segesterone acetate, releases an average of 13 μg ethinylestradiol and 0.15 mg segesterone acetate per day.

Annovera is inserted into the vagina and left for 21 days, then removed, washed and stored for seven days, during which the user experiences a period (withdrawal bleeding.) This can be repeated thirteen times, for one full year of use. Unlike NuvaRing, another vaginal ring contraceptive, Annovera does not need to be refrigerated before being dispensed and can be stored at temperatures up to 30 degrees Celsius.

The medication was developed by the Population Council, an international non-profit organization, and licensed to TherapeuticsMD. It was approved for medical use in the United States in August 2018.

See also
 Combined injectable birth control § Available forms
 List of combined sex-hormonal preparations

References

External links 
 
 

Combined hormonal contraceptives